Castello Roganzuolo (Castél in Venetian language) is a frazione of San Fior comune (municipality) in the Province of Treviso in the Italian region Veneto, located on Conegliano hills (famous for productions of wine, especially prosecco) about 50 km north of Venice and about 30 km northeast of Treviso.

SS. Peter and Paul Church
In this place Titian worked and lived, during the Renaissance, painting a triptych for SS. Peter and Paul Church.
Also Pomponio Amalteo, 15th century painter, and Sante Cancian, 20th century painter, worked in Castello Roganzuolo.

Notes

External links 

Cities and towns in Veneto
Province of Treviso
Frazioni of the Province of Treviso